TGL Co. (The Good Life Company) is a tea and coffee company headquartered in Mumbai, India. It creates specialty teas and coffees with natural and organic ingredients.

History 
Bhuman Dani and Shariq Ashraf co-founded The Good Life Company (d/b/a TGL Co.) in 2016. Dani was inspired by the East India Company in London and undertook apprenticeship with Jane Pettigrew to learn more about teas. Ashraf was influenced with the tea knowledge of Inés Berton, the founder of Tealosophy, and the coffee culture of Melbourne where he lived. Dani and Ashraf met at the Boston Consulting Group alumni meet and shared their mutual interest in teas and coffees. The duo decided to bring specialty tea and coffee range to India and founded the company in 2016.

In 2017, it received seed round of investments from Ayesha Takia Azmi and Abu Farhan Azmi.

Product 
TGL Co. sources teas and coffees from plantations in Japan, China, Taiwan, Sri Lanka, and India. They are blended with various spices and herbs under the controlled supervision of culinary experts and botanists in Europe. Their products include various types of teas such as green teas, white teas, black teas, oolong teas, and tisanes. In 2018, the company ventured into coffee segment with roasted coffee beans and instant coffees. In 2019, they sold over 6 tonnes of tea and 4 tonnes of coffee through their presence across online marketplaces and over 600 HORECA and retail outlets in India.

Recognition 
In 2019, The Good Life Company won the Best Entrepreneur Award at the second edition of the Indo-French Chamber of Commerce and Industry (IFCCI) awards  and bronze medal at the Global Tea Spring Hot Loose Tea Championship held in Colorado, in the gunpowder tea category. It also won the Most Admired Startup of the Year of 2019 by IMAGES Group and listed as 10 Best Startup Brands – 2019 by CEO Insights India. In 2020, it won Startup of the Year by Entrepreneur India.

References

External links 
Official website 

Tea brands
Food and drink companies established in 2016
Indian tea
Tea companies of India
Companies based in Mumbai
Indian companies established in 2016
2016 establishments in Maharashtra